Copestylum violaceum, the purple bromeliad fly, is a species of syrphid fly in the family Syrphidae.

References

Further reading

External links

 

Eristalinae
Insects described in 1829